Jonathan González may refer to:

Jonathan González Ortiz (born 1989), Puerto Rican welterweight boxer
Jonathan González (flyweight) (born 1991), Puerto Rican boxer
Jonathan González (footballer, born 1995), Ecuadorian footballer
Jonathan González (footballer, born 1999), Mexican footballer
Jonathan González (footballer, born 2000), Uruguayan footballer